Mount Somma is a mountain located in the Province of Naples, in the Campania region of southern Italy. Mount Somma is an integral part of the Somma–Vesuvius volcanic complex.

Geography 
Mount Somma is the remnant of a large volcano, out of which the peak cone of Mount Vesuvius has grown. Mount Somma appears to be spread in a semicircle around the north and northeast of Vesuvius. Vesuvius's formation began during the caldera collapse of Mount Somma.

Approaching Mount Somma from the east, four ridges are encountered:
 Cognoli di Trocchia
 Cognoli di Sant'Anastasia
 Punta del Nasone
 Cognoli di Ottaviano

Punta del Nasone 
This similarity can be seen by looking at Mount Somma from Vesuvius's peak while Ferdinand I is well known himself for the advanced approach he had to Somma-Vesuvius volcanic complex, giving support to geological research and improvement of the area.

Lava flows of 1944 
In March 1944, a spectacular lava flow interrupted the north outline of the mountain down to the towns of San Sebastiano al Vesuvio and Massa di Somma. A hiking trail (no. 9 in the numbering of the Vesuvius National Park) allows visitors to cross the entire flow at a width of almost .

Olivella 
It looks like a natural amphitheatre on top of which is located the Olivella spring; a short distance from the outlet is a stone arch that was part of an aqueduct, built in the time of King Ferdinand I to convey water to Naples.

History 
The first evidence of volcanic activity in this area dates back 400,000 years. Still, the first major eruptive phenomenon of some significance occurred about 25,000 years ago: an eruption of pumice when the top of the Somma–Vesuvius volcano collapsed, forming the caldera in which Vesuvius was later formed. Today's Mount Somma is the north rim remnant of that caldera.

Tourism 
Since 1995, Mount Somma has been part of the Vesuvius National Park.

Somma
Mount Vesuvius
Somma
Somma
Geological type localities